Alma is a city in Crawford County, Arkansas, United States. It is located within the Arkansas River Valley at the edge of the Ozark Mountains; the city is the sixth largest in the Fort Smith metropolitan area.  The population was 5,419 at the 2010 Census.  The city is located at the intersection of Interstates 40 and 49.

History
Alma was incorporated in 1874 and the economy was largely agricultural until the introduction of the canning industry.  Today, the city claims the title of "Spinach Capital of the World".

In his book Washington Goes to War, David Brinkley described Alma's participation in the World War II effort:
In the town of Alma, Arkansas (population 776), one-fourth of the girls in the 1944 high school graduating class signed up to leave for Washington, and several of their teachers cast aside their low-paying jobs and went with them, all of them climbing aboard a Pullman car for their first train ride, looking for more money and excitement than they had any reasonable expectation of finding in Alma.

Geography

Alma is located in south-central Crawford County at  (35.488013, -94.220796).

Alma has no airport, and the train station, which fell into a state of dilapidation, was torn down in the early 1970s. Much of its commerce derives from interstate highway traffic, as Interstates 40 and 49 (previously 540), as well as U.S. Routes 64 and 71, pass through the city.

The city gets its water supply from Alma Lake, which is perched above the city on the northeast, held back by a tall earthen dam that blocks Little Frog Bayou. Alma Lake is the reservoir that supplies the city's tap water. Alma sits along the border between the Boston Mountains and the Arkansas River Valley, so while most of the city lies on flat land, immediately to the north is scenic hill country. Alma is surrounded by several rural towns, including Rudy to the north, Dyer and Mulberry to the east, and Kibler to the southwest.

Demographics

2020 census

As of the 2020 United States census, there were 5,825 people, 2,279 households, and 1,539 families residing in the city.

2000 census
As of the census of 2000, there were 4,160 people, 1,560 households, and 1,168 families residing in the city. The racial makeup of the city was 94.66% White, 1.71% Black or African American, 1.56% Native American, 0.10% Asian, 0.12% Pacific Islander, 0.75% from other races, and 1.11% from two or more races. Hispanic or Latino of any race were 3.70% of the population.

There were 1,560 households, out of which 42.8% had children under the age of 18 living with them, 56.1% were married couples living together, 14.7% had a female householder with no husband present, and 25.1% were non-families. 22.3% of all households were made up of individuals, and 10.5% had someone living alone who was 65 years of age or older.  The average household size was 2.66 and the average family size was 3.11.

In the city, the population was spread out, with 32.1% under the age of 18, 9.6% from 18 to 24, 28.9% from 25 to 44, 18.6% from 45 to 64, and 10.8% who were 65 years of age or older.  The median age was 31 years.  For every 100 females, there were 90.2 males.  For every 100 females age 18 and over, there were 85.4 males.

The median income for a household in the city was $28,906, and the median income for a family was $34,068. Males had a median income of $33,235 versus $17,014 for females. The per capita income for the city was $15,227.  11.9% of families and 16.3% of the population were below the poverty line, including 19.7% of those under the age of 18 and 25.4% of those ages 65 or older.

Government
Alma operates under a form of local government where the mayor and city council combine to form the Governing Body. The city council is composed of six council members, with two elected from each of the city's three wards. Ward 1: Sandra Kilpatrick, Larry Blasingame. Ward 2: James McGhee, Eddie Wakefield. Ward 3: Evan Thacker, Gary Perry. Council members serve two-year terms, and elections for all seats are held concurrently. The mayor serves a four-year term. Jerry Martin serves as mayor until his term expires in 2022, when he will be replaced by Mayor-elect Jim Fincher. The city also operates with a city clerk, Khris Miller, and a city attorney, Sean Brister.

Education
Public education for elementary and secondary school students is provided by the Alma School District. The four schools in the district include Alma Primary School, Alma Intermediate School, Alma Middle School and Alma High School.

Arts and culture

Spinach Capital of the World
Around 1987, Alma called itself the "Spinach Capital of the World" because the Allen Canning Company based in Alma canned more than half of all the spinach canned in the U.S., about  annually. The town has had various statues of the cartoon character Popeye, because of his connection to canned spinach; the most recent one was erected in 2007. Cast in bronze, it sits atop a fountain holding a can of spinach. It is the centerpiece of Popeye Park. Crystal City Texas is also considered the Spinach Capital of the World.

Annual cultural events
The annual Spinach Festival is hosted at the City Park and Community Center on the third weekend in April. First held in 1986, the festival is sponsored by the Alma Chamber of Commerce and the Alma Advertising & Promotion Commission. The festival brings carnival rides, crafts, food and live music. A spinach eating contest takes place at noon, followed by a spinach drop. A package of spinach is dropped from an Alma Fire Department ladder truck onto a board with entrant's names, with the winner receiving a cash prize.

Infrastructure

Water

The City of Alma Public Works Department contains the Water & Sewer Division. This group treats and distributes potable water from Lake Alma to the residents and commercial users of the city while also owning and operating a wastewater collection system.

Wastewater is collected and conveyed to the Alma Wastewater Treatment Plant (WWTP). At the WWTP, wastewater passes through a bar screen, Parshall Flume, lagoon 1 (one completely mixed cell followed by two partially mixed cells), Lagoon 2 (facultative), Lagoon 3 (facultative), and optional chlorine/de-chlorination chambers.

Notable people
 Kiley Dean, R&B singer
 Eli Drinkwitz, University of Missouri football coach
 Charlene Fite, Republican member of the Arkansas House of Representatives from District 80; formerly resided in Alma; educator in Fort Smith
 Bradley Hathaway, poet and folk musician
 Morgan Nick, child abduction/murder victim
 Parley Pratt, early leader of the Latter Day Saint movement
 Fay Washington, baseball player

See also

References

External links 

 City of Alma official website
 The Encyclopedia of Arkansas History & Culture
 History of Alma (pdf) from the Alma Chamber of Commerce website

Cities in Arkansas
Cities in Crawford County, Arkansas
Fort Smith metropolitan area
Populated places established in 1874
1874 establishments in Arkansas